Paolo Collaviti (born 2 February 1978 in Lyss, Canton of Bern) is a Swiss football player. He currently plays for BSC Young Boys.

He signed a 1+1 contract with club on 30 June 2007, and compete the first choice goalkeeper place with Marco Wölfli, to replace Matteo Gritti.

References

External links
 Paolo Collaviti Interview

1978 births
Living people
People from Lyss
Swiss people of Italian descent
Swiss men's footballers
BSC Young Boys players
FC Luzern players
FC Concordia Basel players
Yverdon-Sport FC players
Servette FC players
Swiss Super League players
Association football goalkeepers
Sportspeople from the canton of Bern